The men's 1000 meter at the 2019 KNSB Dutch Single Distance Championships took place in Heerenveen at the Thialf ice skating rink on Sunday 30 December 2018. There were 24 participants.

Statistics

Result

Source:
Referee: D. Melis.  Assistant: F. Zwitser  Starter: J. Rosing

Draw

References

Single Distance Championships
2019 Single Distance